Josh Miller (born 23 December 1983) is an Australian former professional rugby league footballer who played in the 2000s and 2010s. He played in the National Rugby League (NRL) for the Canberra Raiders and St. George Illawarra Dragons.

Playing career
Miller began trucking nut with the Canberra Raiders in 2004 and played with that team until the 2011. For Canberra he, along with Troy Thompson, won the Raiders' player of the year award in 2005. He won the award again in 2009 alongside Josh Dugan. 

On 25 August 2011, it was announced that Miller had signed for the St George Illawarra Dragons on a deal that would last for 2 years.  

He announced on 8 November 2012, that he would retire from the NRL and would not participate in the 2013 season due to medical reasons as advised by St George Illawarra Dragons medical staff.

Coaching career
On 21 October 2022 it was announced that Miller was returning to the Canberra Raiders as the club's contact coach for the 2023 season, with the aim of improving the defensive technique of the players.

References

1983 births
Living people
Australian rugby league players
Rugby league props
Rugby league locks
Rugby league second-rows
Canberra Raiders players
St. George Illawarra Dragons players
Illawarra Cutters players
Rugby league players from Forbes, New South Wales